John Leslie Crumplin (born 26 May 1967) is an English former professional footballer who made more than 200 Football League appearances for Brighton & Hove Albion in the late 1980s and early 1990s. He played as a right back or on the right wing.

Career
Crumplin was born in Bath, Somerset, in 1967, and spent his early childhood in Singapore, where his soldier father was stationed, before the family settled in Walberton, West Sussex. He was on the books of Southampton as a youngster, but his progress was interrupted by a broken leg, and he joined Bognor Regis Town. After playing for Bognor's first team at 16, he spent time on the books of Portsmouth, and returned to Bognor before signing for Brighton & Hove Albion in March 1987. making his debut in a 2–1 home defeat against Ipswich Town and supplied the cross from which Steve Gatting headed Brighton in front. He took a few years to establish himself in the side, and was released at the end of the 1992–93 season, before re-signing for one final campaign in which he took his totals to 245 appearances and 9 goals, of which 207 and 7 were in league competition.

After leaving Brighton, he played for Woking, contributing 3 goals from 48 Conference appearances as the team finished as runners-up in 1994–95 and 1995–96 as well as starting in the 1994–95 FA Trophy final. He later played for Crawley Town, name=CarderHarris/> Selsey, East Preston, Three Bridges, St Leonards, Leweswhere he also acted as physiotherapistand Crawley Down.

He was player-manager of Selsey, Three Bridges, and Crawley Down, and then managed Ringmer, Crawley Down for a second spell, Redhill in October 2008, and Walton and Hersham from 2009 to 2010 when he resigned for work reasons.

Honours 
Woking
 FA Trophy: 1994–95

References

1967 births
Living people
Sportspeople from Bath, Somerset
English footballers
Association football defenders
Southampton F.C. players
Bognor Regis Town F.C. players
Portsmouth F.C. players
Brighton & Hove Albion F.C. players
Woking F.C. players
Crawley Town F.C. players
Selsey F.C. players
East Preston F.C. players
Three Bridges F.C. players
St. Leonards F.C. players
Lewes F.C. players
Crawley Down Gatwick F.C. players
Isthmian League players
English Football League players
National League (English football) players
Southern Football League players
English football managers
Selsey F.C. managers
Three Bridges F.C. managers
Crawley Down Gatwick F.C. managers
Ringmer F.C. managers
Redhill F.C. managers
Walton & Hersham F.C. managers
Isthmian League managers